Jang Hanbyul (born 4 July 1990) is a South Korean singer, actor, producer, host and television personality who was the host of After School Club along with co-host, Eric Nam and has appeared on the Code: Secret Room and Society Game. He is the former lead vocalist of Led Apple and made his official debut with mini-album CODA in November 2011. His YouTube channel reached almost 1 million subscribers but was deleted in 2015 following a legal dispute with his previous label. As of 2020, Jang's estimated net worth is US$10 million.

Discography

Singles

Soundtrack appearances

Filmography

Music Videos

Film

Television

Big Stage Season 2

Jang Han-Byul participates in a Malaysian reality show, Big Stage Season 2 which airs on Astro Ria. In this reality show, Jang Han-Byul uses the name Han-Byul

In the final concert of Big Stage Season 2, Han-Byul made history for being the champion from South Korea for the first time in Malaysia Reality Show.

Awards and nominations

References

External links
 
 

1990 births
Living people
K-pop singers
South Korean pop singers
Society Game contestants
South Korean people of Australian descent
Musicians from Brisbane
South Korean male idols
21st-century South Korean  male singers